Garinei  is a surname. Notable people with the surname include:

 Enzo Garinei (1926–2022), Italian actor
 Giuseppe Garinei (1846–?), Italian painter
 Pietro Garinei (1919–2006), Italian playwright, actor, and songwriter

Italian-language surnames